Freeriding is a style of snowboarding or skiing performed on natural, un-groomed terrain, without a set course, goals or rules. It evolved throughout the sport's formative early years as a contrary response to the highly regimented style of ski competition prevalent at the time. Snowboarders primarily refer to freeriding as backcountry, sidecountry, or off-piste snowboarding, and sometimes big mountain or extreme riding.

Freeriding incorporates various aspects of riding into a style that adapts to the variations and challenges of natural, off-piste terrain, and eschews man-made features such as jumps, rails, half-pipes, or groomed snow. Freeriding incorporates aspects of other snowsport disciplines such as freestyle and alpine. This provides the necessary flexibility for varied natural terrain. Whereas freestyle snowboarding relies on the use of man-made terrain such as jumps, rails and half-pipes, and alpine snowboarding is done on groomed snow, freeriding utilizes the random flow of natural terrain to perform similar tricks.

Due to their use of backcountry routes, freeriders are (proportionally) much more likely to become a victim of avalanches. One estimate considers that about 80% of all avalanche deaths in the Alps occur among freeride/backcountry riders.

While the term “freeriding” originated in snowboarding, some skiers have adopted it in recent years. For many years, the skiing equivalent of freeriding was known as freeskiing and referred specifically to off-piste skiing. However over the years, especially since the arrival of snowboarding, the term "freeskiing" has come to refer to freestyle skiing. This has left traditional “freeskiers” without a name for their style of skiing, and so some now use the snowboarding term instead. This became somewhat official in 2013, when the “Freeride World Tour” absorbed the “Freeskiing World Tour” into its schedule of competitive events.

Equipment
Freeride snowboards make up a large part of the market as they are the ideal choice for the all-rounder.

A freeride board usually has a directional shape and flex pattern with a nose that is softer than the tail - this helps with turn initiation and with handling cruddy/choppy snow conditions. Overall a freeride board is stiffer tip to tail and edge to edge for a more precise and stable ride. Boots and bindings are usually stiffer than their freestyle snowboarding counterparts as well.

Some freeride boards are designed more specifically for powder than for groomers. Many powder boards are tapered, which means they have a narrower tail than nose. Some have rocker, which means instead of camber these boards have their lowest point between your bindings and they bend up towards the tips. Some powder boards have a swallow tail design which allows the tail to sink easier which in turn keeps the nose up and some have pintails which make the board faster edge to edge in deep snow.

Personalities
Craig Kelly (April 1, 1966 - January 20, 2003) is known as the 'Godfather of Freeriding'; Terje Haakonsen called Kelly the best snowboarder of all time. He shocked the snowboard industry by walking away from multimillion-dollar deals to pursue freeriding.

The distinctive fluid manner in which he rode was recognized and acclaimed in the snowboarding community. He was called a "style master" by snowboard magazine editor Jon Foster. Kelly appeared in many video and photo shoots. He was known for looking straight at the camera, even in the midst of a difficult aerial maneuver.

Kelly was a Sims Snowboards team rider for a few years early in his career, but spent most of his life riding for Burton Snowboards. He was responsible for the design and development of many snowboards for the Burton Snowboards brand. The company's founder, Jake Burton, is quoted as saying, “When I started listening to Craig, that was when my company became successful and really took off.” He added, “… when the rest of the industry listened to Craig, that was when the sport really took off.”

Craig Kelly died on January 20, 2003, near Revelstoke, British Columbia, Canada in an avalanche which trapped 8 people and killed 6 others. Jacques Russo's film documentary, "Let It Ride", celebrates Craig Kelly's life.

Johan Olofsson (born  October 27, 1976) is a snowboarder known for being one of the first riders to take freestyle tricks more commonly performed in man-made terrain parks into the big mountain freeriding environments of Alaska. Originally coming from a freestyle background,  Olofsson adapted his spin tricks and jibs to the backcountry environment. He gained attention and respect from the freeriding community when he started performing these tricks off natural features such as windlips and cliffs in the midst of steep lines in the Alaskan ranges.

Jeremy Jones (born 14 January 1975) is a former snowboard racer now regarded as a pioneer of professional big mountain riding. His style is a seminal influence on modern big mountain freeriding.

Travis Rice (born October 9, 1982) is regarded as the “Paul Revere” of the big mountain freestyle movement. Best known for his success in the realm of freestyle snowboarding competition, his ability to adapt his skills to extreme terrain has gained him legendary status in backcountry circles as well.

Competition
Freeride competitions basically involve negotiating steep natural terrain fluidly in a similar approach to slopestyle competitors in a terrain park. However unlike the freestyle discipline of slopestyle, there are no perfect man-made takeoffs or landings - each individual rider's route varies, and is personally plotted out in pre-run inspections. Constantly changing weather and snow conditions add an extra element to these events, and the unpredictably random aspect of freeride terrain contributes to a high risk of personal injury.

The Freeride World Tour is an annually toured series of events in which the world's best freeriders compete for individual event wins, as well as the overall title of World Champion in their respective genders and disciplines. The first event series under the Freeride World Tour moniker took place in 2008. Prior to that it was known as the Verbier Extreme, originally a snowboard only contest launched in 1996 - with skiers also invited to compete in 2004. For the 2013 season, the Freeride World Tour merged with the Freeskiing World Tour and The North Face Masters of Snowboarding, combining all three tours under one unified global championship series.

From 1995-2001 New Zealand's World Heli Challenge invited international extreme snowboarders and skiers to compete in New Zealand's Mt. Cook National Park. The helicopter-accessed competition occurred over a two-week period to allow for weather and snow conditions.  In 2001, the tragedy of the 9/11 terrorist attacks interrupted international sponsorship support leading to an eight-year break. Footage from the previous years events continued to play worldwide. In 2009 the World Heli Challenge resumed and has been running annually ever since.

References

Snowboarding
Freestyle skiing